This is a summary of the year 2022 in British music.

Events 
 19 January – English Touring Opera announces that James Conway is to stand down as its artistic director at the close of 2022, and to serve in a part-time capacity in the post for the remainder of the calendar year.
 8 February
 The BBC Scottish Symphony Orchestra announces the appointment of Ryan Wigglesworth as its next chief conductor, effective September 2022.
 The 2022 Brit Awards are the first to be held without gender-related categories.
 Adele makes a rare live appearance at the 2022 Brit Awards.
 9 February – The Barbican Centre announces the appointment of Claire Spencer as its first-ever chief executive officer, effective May 2022.
 29 March – Concert for Ukraine, a two-hour fundraising event organised by ITV, Livewire Pictures, Global Radio and the Disasters Emergency Committee, takes place in Birmingham.
 25 April – The Philharmonia Orchestra announces the appointment of Thorben Dittes as its next chief executive, effective 1 August 2022.
 19 May – The Academy of St Martin in the Fields announces the appointment of Annie Lydford as its next chief executive, effective September 2022.
 21 May – The first night of the new Glyndebourne Festival Opera production of The Wreckers takes place, the first opera by a female composer to be staged at Glyndebourne, and the first professional staging of the opera with its original French libretto.
 23 May
 The BBC announces its new roster of New Generation Artists for the period 2022-2024:
 Santiago Cañón-Valencia (cellist)
 Ryan Corbett (accordionist)
 Hugh Cutting (countertenor)
 Leonkoro Quartet
 Geneva Lewis (violinist)
 Fergus McCreadie (jazz pianist)
 Masabane Cecilia Rangwanasha (soprano) 
 The English Symphony Orchestra announces the appointment of Seb Lovell-Huckle as its next chief executive officer, effective 8 August 2022.
 31 May – The Association of British Orchestra announces that Mark Pemberton is to stand down as its chief executive at the end of September 2022.
 1 June: Queen's Birthday Honours (Platinum Jubilee)
 Stephen Hough is made a Knight Bachelor.
 Chi-chi Nwanoku is made a Commander of the Order of the British Empire.
 Harry Bicket, Justin Hayward, and David Jackson are each made an Officer of the Order of the British Empire.
 Hugh Atkins (Tim Blacksmith), Sandra Colston, Julia Desbrulais, Beverley Humphreys, Elizabeth Llewellyn, Elaine Mitchener, and Bonnie Tyler are each made a Member of the Order of the British Empire.
 21 June – The Orlando Consort announces that it is to disband in June 2023.
 24 June – Billie Eilish headlines the Pyramid stage at the 2022 Glastonbury Festival, the youngest headliner in Glastonbury's history.
 25 June – Sir Paul McCartney headlines the Pyramid stage at the 2022 Glastonbury Festival, the oldest headliner in Glastonbury's history.
 5 July
 Westminster Abbey announces the appointment of Andrew Nethsingha as its next organist and master of choristers, effective in 2023.
 St. John's College, Cambridge announces that Andrew Nethsingha is to stand down as its director of music at the close of 2022.
 27 July – Belfast Cathedral announces the disbandement of its cathedral choir and the elimination of the post of Director of Music, effective 1 September 2022.
 9 August – The Royal Albert Hall announces that Craig Hassall is to stand down as its chief executive officer in early 2023.
 7 September – Southbank Sinfonia at St John's Smith Square announces the departure today of Richard Heaton as its co-director.
 8 September
 Opera North announces that Richard Mantle is to stand down as its general director at the end of 2023.
 Following the death of HRH Queen Elizabeth II, the BBC Proms cancels the remaining three Proms of the 2022 season, including The Last Night, the first cancellation of The Last Night since 1944.
 12 September – The BBC announces that Alan Davey is to stand down as controller of BBC Radio 3 in March 2023.
 20 September – The Ulster Orchestra announces simultaneously the appointment of Auveen Sands as its next chief executive, the first woman named to the post, effective at the end of October 2022, and the elevation of Daniele Rustioni's title with the orchestra to music director with immediate effect.

Bands formed
 CuteBad

Bands disbanded 
 Genesis
 Supergrass

Bands reformed 
 The Damned (original line-up)
 The Delgados
 Everything but the Girl
 Hard-Fi
 Inspiral Carpets
 Pink Floyd - a one off recording, "Hey, Hey, Rise Up!", in aid of Ukrainian Humanitarian relief, following the Russian invasion of Ukraine
 Pulp
 Roxy Music
 Symposium

Classical works 
 Joseph Davies – Parallax (for violin and orchestra)
 Simon Holt – The Sower
 Helen Grime – Trumpet Concerto: night-sky-blue
 Richard Baker – The Price of Curiosity
 Alex Mills – Landsker
 Graham Fitkin – Bla, Bla, Bla
 Gavin Higgins (music) and Francesca Simon (text) – The Faerie Bride
 Charlotte Bray
 Forsaken
 'The Earth Cried Out to the Sky' (settings of English translations of texts by Borys Humenyuk and Ostap Slyvynsky)
 Conor Mitchell – Look Both Ways (text excerpts by Peter Pears and Benjamin Britten)
 Claire Victoria Roberts – Like Ships Adrift
 Sally Beamish – Hive (concerto for harp and orchestra)
 Julian Anderson – Symphony No. 2 (Prague Panoramas)
 Gavin Higgins – Concerto Grosso for Brass Band and Orchestra
 Matthew Kaner (music) and Simon Armitage (text) – Pearl
 Errolyn Wallen – LADY SUPER SPY ADVENTURER
 Public Service Broadcasting – This New Noise
 Judith Weir - 'Like as the hart'
 Sir James MacMillan -  'Who shall separate us from the love of Christ?'

New operas
 Tom Coult and Alice Birch – Violet
 Will Todd (composer), David Pountney, Sarah Woods, Edson Burton, Miles Chambers, Eric Ngalle Charles, Shreya Sen-Handley (librettists) – Migrations
 Laura Bowler and Laura Lomas – The Blue Woman

British music awards 
 6 January – PinkPantheress is announced as the BBC Sound of 2022.
 8 February – Brit Awards – see 2022 Brit Awards

Charts and sales

Number-one singles 

The singles chart includes a proportion for streaming.

Number-one albums 
The albums chart includes a proportion for streaming.

Number-one compilation albums 
The compilation chart includes a proportion for streaming.

Year-end charts

Top singles of the year
This chart was published by the Official Charts Company on January 4, 2023

Best-selling albums
This chart was published by the Official Charts Company on January 4, 2023

Deaths 
 10 January – Francis Jackson, organist and composer, 104
 18 January – Roger Tapping, classical violist resident in the US and past violist of the Takács Quartet, 61
 19 January – Nigel Rogers, classical tenor and early music specialist, 86
 30 January – Norma Waterson, English folk singer, songwriter (The Watersons), 82, pneumonia.
 9 February
 Joseph Horovitz, Austrian-born classical composer, 95
 Ian McDonald, English multi-instrumental musician, (King Crimson), (Foreigner), 75, cancer.
 19 February – Gary Brooker, singer, songwriter, musician, (Procol Harum), 76 (cancer)
 20 February – Jamal Edwards, DJ, entrepreneur, 31 (heart attack)
 25 February – MC Skibadee, musician, drum and bass MC, 54
 26 February – Nicky Tesco, singer, (The Members), 66
 13 March – Mary Lee, singer, 100
 24 March – John McLeod, classical composer, 88 
 25 March – Philip Jeck, experimental composer, 69
 26 March – Tina May, singer, 60
 30 March – Tom Parker, singer, (The Wanted), 33, brain tumour.
 7 April – Christopher Ball, classical composer, 85
 18 April – Harrison Birtwistle, classical composer, 87
 1 May – Ric Parnell, drummer (Atomic Rooster), (Spinal Tap), 70.
 11 May – William Bennett, classical flautist, 86
 13 May
 Ricky Gardiner, guitarist, composer, worked with (David Bowie), (Iggy Pop), 73, Parkinsons.
 Simon Preston, classical organist, conductor, and composer, 83
 17 May – Rick Price, bassist (The Move) (Wizzard), 77
 18 May
 Cathal Coughlan, singer and musician, (Microdisney), (The Fatima Mansions), 61
 Anne Howells, classical mezzo-soprano, 81
 26 May 
 Andy Fletcher, keyboard player, DJ, (Depeche Mode), 60
 Alan White, drummer, (Yes), (Plastic Ono Band), 72
 8 June – David Lloyd-Jones, classical conductor and founder of Opera North, 87
 2 July – Peter Brook, theatre and opera director, 97
 4 July – Alan Blaikley, songwriter and composer, 82
 5 July – Manny Charlton, rock guitarist (Nazareth), 81
 9 July – Barbara Thompson, jazz saxophonist (Colosseum, Manfred Mann's Earth Band, Keef Hartley Band), 77
 10 July – Andrew Ball, classical pianist, 72
 11 July – Monty Norman, composer ("James Bond Theme"), 94
 12 July – Bramwell Tovey, classical conductor and composer, 69
 15 July – Paul Ryder, bassist, (Happy Mondays), 58
 25 July – Martin How, classical composer and organist, 91
 27 July 
 Bernard Cribbins, actor and singer ("Hole in the Ground", "Right Said Fred"), 93.
 Tom Springfield, musician (The Springfields) and songwriter ("I'll Never Find Another You", "Georgy Girl"), 88
 3 August – Nicky Moore, singer (Samson), 75
 8 August 
 Darryl Hunt, bassist (The Pogues), 72
 Olivia Newton-John, English-Australian singer, songwriter and actress, 73
 11 August – Darius Campbell, Scottish singer ("Colourblind". "Incredible (What I Meant to Say)", "Girl in the Moon"), songwriter, musician, actor, film producer, 41.
 15 August
 Daphne Godson, classical violinist and founding member of the Scottish Baroque Ensemble, 90
 Steve Grimmett, heavy metal singer (Grim Reaper, Onslaught, Lionsheart), 62
 2 September – Drummie Zeb, English reggae musician (Aswad) and record producer, 62.
 14 September – Paul Sartin, English folk singer, musician (Bellowhead, Faustus, Belshazzar's Feast) and composer, 51.
 22 September – Stu Allan, dance music DJ (Clock) and record producer, 60, stomach cancer.
 3 November – Noel McKoy, soul singer, 62.
 8 November – Dan McCafferty, Scottish singer-songwriter, musician (Nazareth), 76.
 10 November – Nik Turner, English musician, saxophonist and flautist (Hawkwind), 82.
 11 November
 Keith Levene, English guitarist, musician, founding member of (The Clash), (Public Image Ltd), 65.
 Rab Noakes, Scottish singer-songwriter, musician (Stealers Wheel), 75.
 21 November – Wilko Johnson, English guitarist, singer, songwriter, actor, (Dr. Feelgood), (The Blockheads), 75.
 30 November – Christine McVie, English singer, musician, keyboardist, (Fleetwood Mac), (Chicken Shack), 79
 3 December – Jamie Freeman, singer and songwriter, brain cancer, 57.
 6 December – Jet Black, English drummer, (The Stranglers), 84.
 10 December – Tracy Hitchings, English musician (Landmarq), 60, cancer.
 13 December
Bayan Northcott, English music critic (The Independent, BBC Music Magazine) and composer, 82.
Kim Simmonds, Welsh rock singer and musician, (Savoy Brown), 75, colon cancer.
 18 December
Martin Duffy, English keyboardist, (Primal Scream), (Felt), 55, complications from a fall. 
Terry Hall, English singer, musician, (The Specials), (Fun Boy Three), (The Colourfield), 63.
 23 December - Maxi Jazz, English musician, rapper, singer-songwriter, DJ.(Faithless), 65

See also 
 2022 in British radio
 2022 in British television
 2022 in the United Kingdom
 List of British films of 2022

Notes

References 

2022